Susumu Wakita (born 11 May 1947) is a Japanese professional golfer.

Wakita played on the Japan Golf Tour, winning once.

Professional wins (1)

Japan Golf Tour wins (1)
1983 Kansai Open

External links

Japanese male golfers
Japan Golf Tour golfers
Sportspeople from Hyōgo Prefecture
1947 births
Living people